Christian Osepins (1858–1887) was a Dutch-born United States Navy sailor and a recipient of the United States military's highest decoration, the Medal of Honor.

Biography
Osepins was born "Christiaan Osephius" in Schiedam to Gerritje Ruigrok and Johannes Osephius. Osephius immigrated to the United States and joined the Navy from New York as Christian Osepins. On that day, while Fortune was at Hampton Roads, Virginia, he and another sailor, Ordinary Seaman Johannes Rouning, jumped overboard and rescued Gunner's Mate James Walters from drowning.

For this action, both Osepins and Rouning were awarded the Medal of Honor two and a half years later, on October 18, 1884. Osepins had not claimed his medal as of 1898, and the decoration remained in the possession of the Navy Department.

Osepins's official Medal of Honor citation reads:
For jumping overboard from the U.S. Tug Fortune, 7 May 1882, at Hampton Roads, Va., and rescuing from drowning James Walters, gunner's mate. Osepns died only 3 years later and was buried in his hometown of Schiedam.

See also

List of Medal of Honor recipients in non-combat incidents

References

External links

1858 births
1887 deaths
Dutch emigrants to the United States
Foreign-born Medal of Honor recipients
Non-combat recipients of the Medal of Honor
People from Schiedam
United States Navy sailors
United States Navy Medal of Honor recipients